The White Parade is a 1934 film directed by Irving Cummings and starring Loretta Young and John Boles. It was written by Rian James, Jesse Lasky Jr., Sonya Levien and Ernest Pascal, from the novel by Rian James.

Dedicated to "the memory of Florence Nightingale", the plot concerns the travails and romances of young women as they study to become nurses.  The film was nominated for the Academy Award for Best Picture.

The only surviving print is located at the UCLA film archive. The print is in rough shape; several frames are out of alignment, at times, while the whole picture looks bleached out and very fuzzy. As well, near the end of the film, a sign pops up indicating "reel 7".

Cast
Loretta Young as June Arden
John Boles as Ronald Hall III
Dorothy Wilson as Zita Scofield
Muriel Kirkland as Glenda Farley
Astrid Allwyn as Gertrude Mack
Frank Conroy as Dr. Thorne
Jane Darwell as Miss 'Sailor' Roberts
Sara Haden as Miss Harrington
Joyce Compton as Una Mellon
June Gittelson as Lou 'Pudgy' Stebbins
Polly Ann Young as Hannah Seymour
Noel Francis as Nurse Clare
 Shirley Palmer as Telephone Operator

Reception
The film was a success at the box office.

Awards
The White Parade was nominated for the Best Picture Oscar in 1934. Loretta Young also appeared in The House of Rothschild the same year, which was also nominated for the Academy Award for Best Picture. The film was also nominated in the category Sound Recording (Edmund H. Hansen).

References

External links

 

1934 films
1934 drama films
American black-and-white films
1930s English-language films
Films directed by Irving Cummings
Medical-themed films
Films with screenplays by Sonya Levien
American drama films
Fox Film films
1930s American films